The Muslim conquests in the Indian subcontinent mainly took place between the 13th and the 18th centuries. Earlier Muslim conquests in the subcontinent include the invasions which started in what is now modern-day Pakistan, especially the Umayyad campaigns during the 8th century and the resistance to them by the Rajputs.

Mahmud of Ghazni, who was the first Sultan, and preserved an ideological link to the suzerainty of the Abbasid Caliphate, invaded and plundered vast parts of Punjab and Gujarat during the 11th century.

After the capture of Lahore and the end of the Ghaznavids, the Ghurid ruler Muhammad of Ghor laid the foundation of Muslim rule in India. In 1206, Bakhtiyar Khalji led the Muslim conquest of Bengal, marking the easternmost expansion of Islam at the time. The Ghurid Empire soon evolved into the Delhi Sultanate, ruled by Qutb ud-Din Aibak, the founder of the Mamluk dynasty. With the Delhi Sultanate established, Islam was spread across most parts of the Indian subcontinent.

In the 14th century, the Khalji dynasty under Alauddin Khalji, extended Muslim rule southwards to Gujarat, Rajasthan, and the Deccan. The successor Tughlaq dynasty temporarily expanded its territorial reach to Tamil Nadu. The disintegration of the Delhi Sultanate, mainly caused by Timur's invasion in 1398, caused several Muslim sultanates and dynasties to emerge across the Indian subcontinent, such as the Gujarat Sultanate, Malwa Sultanate, Khandesh Sultanate, Bahmani Sultanate, Jaunpur Sultanate, Madurai Sultanate, and the wealthy and powerful Bengal Sultanate, a major trading nation in the world. Some of these, however, were followed by Hindu reconquests and resistance from the native powers and states, such as the Kamma Nayakas, Vijayanagaras, Maratha Empire, and Rajput states.

The Sur Empire, ruled by Sher Shah Suri, conquered large territories in the northern parts of India prior to the complete dominance of the Mughal Empire which was one of the three gunpowder empires. Emperor Akbar gradually enlarged the Mughal Empire to include a large portion of the subcontinent. The zenith was reached at the end of the 17th century, when the reign under emperor Aurangzeb witnessed the full establishment of Islamic Sharia through the Fatawa al-Alamgir.

The Mughals suffered a major decline in the early 18th century, mostly after their defeat in the Mughal-Rajput Wars and the Mughal–Maratha Wars. The Afsharid ruler Nader Shah's invasion in 1739 was an unexpected attack which demonstrated the weakness of the Mughal Empire. This provided opportunities for the powerful Rajput states, Mysore Kingdom, Nawabs of Bengal and Murshidabad, Maratha Empire, Sikh Empire, and Nizams of Hyderabad to exercise control over large regions of the Indian subcontinent. The Maratha Empire was the dominant force on the subcontinent after the Mughals.

After the Battle of Plassey, the Battle of Buxar, Anglo-Mysore Wars, Anglo-Maratha Wars and Anglo-Sikh Wars the British East India Company seized control of much of the Indian subcontinent. Throughout the 18th century, European powers continued to exert a large amount of political influence over the Indian subcontinent, and by the end of the 19th century most of the Indian subcontinent came under European colonial domination, most notably the British Raj.

Considering the complex history of the Muslim conquests of India, their recollection and legacy is indubitably controversial. The legacy of the Muslim conquest of South Asia is a hotly debated issue and argued even today.

First phase (8th to 10th centuries)

Early Muslim presence
Islam in South Asia existed in communities along the Arab coastal trade routes in Sindh, Bengal, Gujarat, Kerala, and Ceylon. The religion originated and had gained early acceptance in the Arabian Peninsula. The first incursion by the new Muslim successor states of the Arab world occurred around 636 AD or 643 AD, during the Rashidun Caliphate, long before any Arab army reached the frontier of India by land. Uthman ibn Abi al-As al-Thaqafi, the governor of Bahrain and Oman, sent out ships to raid Thane, near modern-day Mumbai. His brother Hakam sailed to Broach and a third fleet sailed to Debal under his younger brother Mughira either in 636 or 643 AD, according to one source, which does not specifically state the results but mentions that these expeditions were sent without the Caliph Umar's consent, and he rebuked Uthman, saying that had the Arabs lost any men in the expeditions, the Caliph would have killed an equal number of men who had participated from Uthman's tribe in retaliation. However, another source states Mughira was defeated and killed at Debal. The expeditions may have been sent to attack pirates to safeguard Arabian trade in the Arabian Sea, and not to start the conquest of India. Shortly after the Muslim conquest of Persia, the connection between the Sindh and Islam was established by the initial Muslim missions during the Rashidun Caliphate.

Rashidun Caliphate and the Indian frontier

The kingdoms of Kapisa-Gandhara in modern-day Afghanistan, Zabulistan, and Sindh (which then held Makran) in modern-day Pakistan, all of which were culturally and politically part of India since ancient times, were known as "The Frontier of Al Hind" to the Arabs.  Makran had been conquered by Chach of Alor in 631 AD, but ten years later, it was described as "under the government of Persia" by Xuanzang, who had visited the region in 641 AD.

The first clash between a ruler of an Indian kingdom and the Arabs took place in 643 AD, when Arab forces defeated Rutbil, the King of Zabulistan in Sistan. Arabs led by Suhail b. Abdi and Hakam al Taghilbi later defeated a local army in the Battle of Rasil in 644 AD beside the Indian Ocean sea coast, then reached the Indus River. Caliph Umar ibn Al-Khattab denied them permission to cross the river or operate on Indian soil and the Arabs returned home. Al-Hakim ibn Jabalah al-Abdi, who attacked Makran in the year 649 AD, was an early partisan of Ali ibn Abu Talib.  

Abdullah ibn Aamir led the invasion of Khurasan in 650 AD, and his general Rabi b. Ziyad Al Harithi attacked Sistan and took Zaranj and surrounding areas in 651 AD while Ahnaf ibn Qais conquered the Hepthalites of Herat in 652 AD and advanced up to Balkh by 653 AD. Arab conquests now bordered the Kingdoms of Kapisa, Zabul and Sindh in modern-day Afghanistan and Pakistan. The Arabs levied annual tributes on the newly captured areas, and after leaving 4,000 men garrisons at Merv and Zaranj, retired to Iraq instead of pushing on against the frontier of India. Caliph Uthman b. Affan sanctioned an attack against Makran in 652 AD, and sent a recon mission to Sindh in 653 AD. The mission described Makran as inhospitable, and Caliph Uthman, probably assuming the country beyond the Indus was much worse, forbade any further incursions into India. During the caliphate of Ali, many Hindus of Sindh had come under the influence of Shi'ism and some even participated in the Battle of Camel and died fighting for Ali.

Under the Umayyads (661–750 AD), many Shias sought asylum in the region of Sindh, to live in relative peace in the remote area. Ziyad Hindi was one of those refugees.

Umayyad expansion in Al Hind

Mu'awiya I established the Umayyad rule over the Arabs after the First Fitna in 661 AD, and resumed expansion of the Muslim empire. Al-Baladuri wrote that "In the year 664 AD, and in the days of the Mu'awiya I, Muhallib son of Abu Safra made war upon the same frontier, and advanced as far as Banna (Bannnu) and Al-Ahwar (Lahore) which lie between Multan and Kabul.”

After 663-665 AD, the Arabs launched an invasion against Kapisa, Zabul and what is now Pakistani Balochistan. Abdur Rahman b. Samurra besieged Kabul in 663 AD, while Haris b Marrah advanced against Kalat after marching through Fannazabur and Quandabil and moving through the Bolan Pass. King Chach of Sindh sent an army against the Arabs, the Arabs were trapped when the enemy blocked the mountain passes, Haris was killed and his army was annihilated. Al-Muhallab ibn Abi Sufra took a detachment through the Khyber pass towards Multan in Southern Punjab in modern-day Pakistan in 664 AD, then pushed south into Kikan, and may have also raided Quandabil. Turki Shah and Zunbil expelled Arabs from their respective kingdoms by 670 AD, and Zunbil began assisting in organizing resistance against the Arabs in Makran.

This was the beginning of a prolonged struggle between the rulers of Kabul and Zabul in modern-day and Pakistan against successive Arab governors of Sistan, Khurasan and Makran. The Kabul Shahi kings and their Zunbil kinsmen successfully blocked access to the Khyber Pass and Gomal Pass routes into India from 653 to 870 AD, while modern Balochistan, Pakistan, comprising the areas of Kikan or Qiqanan, Nukan, Turan, Buqan, Qufs, Mashkey and Makran, would face several Arab expeditions between 661 and 711 AD. The Arabs launched several raids against these frontier lands, but repeated rebellions in Sistan and Khurasan between 653 and 691 AD diverted much of their military resources in order to subdue these breakaway provinces and away from expansion into Al Hind. Muslim control of these areas ebbed and flowed repeatedly as a result until 870 AD. Arab troops disliked being stationed in Makran, and were reluctant to campaign in the Kabul area and Zabulistan due to the difficult terrain and underestimation of Zunbil's power. The fierce resistance of Zunbil and Turki Shah stalled Arab progress repeatedly in the "Frontier Zone". and the Arabs had to focus on tribute extraction instead of systematic conquest as a result.

Battles in Makran and Zabulistan
Arabs launched several campaigns in eastern Balochistan between 661 and 681 AD. Four Arab commanders were killed during these campaigns, however, Sinan b. Salma managed to conquer parts of Makran including the Chagai area, and established a permanent base of operations by 673 AD. Rashid b. Amr, the next governor of Makran, subdued Mashkey in 672 AD. Munzir b. Jarood Al Abadi managed to garrison Kikan and conquer Buqan by 681 AD, while Ibn Harri Al Bahili conducted several campaigns to secure the Arab hold on Kikan, Makran and Buqan by 683 AD. Zunbil saw off Arab campaigns in 668, 672 and 673 AD by paying tribute. Although Arabs occupied the areas south of Helmand in 673 AD permanently Zunbil defeated Yazid b. Salm's army in 681 AD at Junzah, and Arabs had to pay 500,000 dirhams as ransom to get free their prisoners, however, the Arabs defeated and killed Zunbil after his invasion of Sistan in 685 AD. The Arabs were defeated in Zabul by Zunbil in 693 AD.

Al Hajjaj and the East

Al-Hajjaj ibn Yusuf Al Thaqifi, who had played a crucial role during the Second Fitna for the Umayyad cause, was appointed the governor of Iraq in 694 AD. Hajjaj received governorship of Khurasan and Sistan in 697 AD and he sponsored Muslim expansions in Makran, Sistan, Transoxiana and Sindh.

Campaigns in Makran and Zabul
The Arab's hold on Makran weakened when Arab rebels seized the province, and Hajjaj had to send expeditions under three governors between 694 and 707 AD before Makran was partially recovered by 694 AD. Al Hajjaj also fought against Zunbil in 698 AD and 700 AD. The 20,000 strong army led by Ubaidullah ibn Abu Bakra was trapped by the armies of Zunbil and Turki Shah near Kabul in 698 AD, and lost 15,000 men to thirst and hunger, earning this force the title of the "Doomed Army". Abd al-Rahman ibn Muhammad ibn al-Ash'ath next led 20,000 troops each from Kufa and Basra (Dubbed the "Peacock Army" due to the splemdor of ther equipment and participation numerous members of Arab nobility) in a successful campaign in 700 AD, but when he wanted to stop during winter, Al-Hajjaj's insulting rebuke led to mutiny. The mutiny was put down by 704 AD, and Al-Hajjaj granted a 7-year truce to Zunbil.

Umayyad expansion in Sind and Multan

Medspirates operated from their bases at Kutch, Debal and Kathiawar and during one of their raids had kidnapped Muslim women travelling from Sri Lanka to Arabia, thus providing the casus belli against Sindh Raja Dahir.
Raja Dahir of Sindh had previously refused to return Arab rebels from Sindh and furthermore,  he now expressed his inability to punish the pirates.  Hajjaj sent two expeditions to Sindh, bothy of which were defeated. Al Hajjaj next equipped an army built around 6,000 Syrian cavalry and detachments of mawali from Iraq, six thousand camel riders, and a baggage train of 3,000 camels under his Nephew Muhammad bin Qasim to Sindh. His artillery of five catapults were sent to Debal by sea ("manjaniks").

Conquest of Sindh
Muhammad bin Qasim departed from Shiraz in 710 AD, the army marched along the coast to Tiaz in Makran, where the army of Makran joined him, and the combined force moved to the Kech valley. Muhammad re-subdued the restive towns of Fannazbur and Armabil (Lasbela), finally completing the conquest of Makran. Then the army met up with the reinforcements and catapults sent by sea near Debal and took Debal through assault. From Debal, the Arabs moved towards north along the Indus, clearing the region up to Budha. Some towns like Nerun and Sadusan (Sehwan) surrendered peacefully, while tribes inhabiting Sisam were defeated in the battle. Muhammad bin Qasim moved back to Nerun to resupply and receive reinforcements sent by Hajjaj. The Arabs crossed the Indus further South and defeated the army of Dahir, who was killed. The Arabs then marched north along the east bank of the Indus after the siege and capture of Rawer. Brahmanabad, then Alor (Aror) and finally Multan, were captured alongside other in-between towns with only light Muslim casualties. Arabs marched up to the foothills of Kashmir along the Jhelum in 713 AD, and stormed the Al-Kiraj (probably the Kangra valley). Muhammad was deposed after the death of Caliph Walid in 715 AD. Jai Singh, son of Dahir captured Brahmanabad and Arab rule was restricted to the Western shore of the Indus. Sindh was briefly lost to the caliph when the rebel Yazid b. Muhallab took over Sindh in 720 AD.

Last Umayyad campaigns in Al Hind

Junaid b. Abd Al Rahman Al Marri became the governor of Sindh in 723 AD. He conquered Debal, defeated and killed Jai Singh, secured Sindh and Southern Punjab and then stormed Al Kiraj (Kangra valley) in 724 AD. Junaid next attacked a number of Hindu kingdoms in what is now Rajasthan, Gujarat and Madhya Pradesh aiming at permanent conquest, but the chronology and area of operation of the campaigns during 725–743 AD is difficult to follow because accurate, complete information is lacking. The Arabs moved east from Sindh in several detachments and probably attacked from both the land and the sea, occupying Mirmad (Marumada, in Jaisalmer), Al-Mandal (perhaps Okhamandal in Gujarat) or Marwar, and raiding Dahnaj, not identified, al-Baylaman (Bhilmal) and Jurz (Gurjara country—north Gujarat and southern Rajasthan), attacking Barwas (Broach), and sacking Vallabhi. Gurjara king Siluka repelled Arabs from "Stravani and Valla", probably the area North of Jaisalmer and Jodhpur, and the invasion of Malwa but were ultimately defeated by Bappa Rawal and Nagabhata I in 725 AD near Ujjain. Arabs lost control over the newly conquered territories and part of Sindh due to Arab tribal infighting and Arab soldiers deserting the newly conquered territory in 731 AD.

Al Hakam b. Awana Al Kalbi in 733 AD, founded the garrison city of Al Mahfuza ("The Well Guarded") similar to Kufa, Basra and Wasit, on the eastern side of a lake near Brahmanabad. Hakam next attempted to reclaim the conquests of Junaid in Al Hind. Arab records merely state that he was successful, Indian records at Navasari details that Arab forces defeated "Kacchella, Saindhava, Saurashtra, Cavotaka, Maurya and Gurjara" kings. The city of Al Mansura ("The Victorious") was founded near Al Mahfuza to commemorate pacification of Sindh by Amr b. Muhammad in c738 AD. Al Hakam next invaded the Deccan in 739 AD with the intention of permanent conquest, but was decisively defeated at Navsari by the viceroy Avanijanashraya Pulakeshin of the Chalukya Empire serving Vikramaditya II. Arab rule was restricted to the west of Thar desert.

Last days of Abbasid Caliphate control

When the Abbasid Revolution overthrew the Umayyads in 750 AD after the Third Fitna, Sindh became independent and was captured by Musa b. K'ab al Tamimi in 752 AD. Zunbil had defeated the Arabs in 728 AD, and saw off two Abbasid invasions in 769 and 785 AD. Abbasids attacked Kabul several times and collected tribute between 787 and 815 AD and extracted tribute after each campaign. Abbasid's Governor of Sindh, Hisham (in office 768–773 AD) raided Kashmir, recaptured parts of Punjab from Karkota control, and launched naval raids against ports of Gujarat in 758 and 770 AD. These raids like other Abbasid Naval raids launched in 776 and 779 AD, gained no territory. Arabs occupied Sindian (Southern Kutch) in 810 AD, only to lose it in 841 AD.
Civil war erupted in Sindh in 842 AD, and the Habbari dynasty occupied Mansurah, and by 871 AD, five independent principalities had emerged, with the Banu Habbari clan controlling in Mansurah, Banu Munabbih occupying Multan, Banu Madan ruling in Makran, and Makshey and Turan falling to other rulers, all outside direct Caliphate control. Ismaili missionaries found a receptive audience among both the Sunni and non-Muslim populations in Multan, which became a center of the Ismaili sect of Islam. The Saffarid Dynasty of Zaranj occupied Kabul and the kingdom of Zunbil permanently in 871 AD. A new chapter of Muslim conquests began when the Samanid Dynasty took over the Saffarid Kingdom and Sabuktigin seized Ghazni.

Later Muslim invasions

After the Decline of the Caliphate, Muslim incursions resumed under the later Turkic and Central Asian dynasties like the Saffarid dynasty and the Samanid Dynasty with more local capitals. They supplanted the Abbasid Caliphate and expanded their domains both northwards and eastwards. Continuous raids from these empires in the north-west of India led to the loss of stability in the Indian kingdoms, and led to the establishment of Islam in the heart of India.

Second phase (11th to 13th centuries)

Ghaznavid Sultanate

Under Sabuktigin, the Ghaznavid Empire found itself in conflict with the Kabul Shahi Raja Jayapala in the east. When Sabuktigin died and his son Mahmud ascended the throne in 998 AD, Ghazni was engaged in the North with the Qarakhanids when the Shahi Raja renewed hostilities in east once again.

In the early 11th century, Mahmud of Ghazni launched seventeen expeditions into Indian subcontinent. In 1001 AD, Sultan Mahmud of Ghazni defeated Raja Jayapala of the Hindu Shahi Dynasty of Gandhara (in modern Afghanistan), in the Battle of Peshawar and marched further towards the west of Peshawar (in modern Pakistan) and, in 1005 AD, made it the center for his forces.

In 1030 AD, Al Biruni reported on the devastation caused during the conquest of Gandhara and much of northwest India by Mahmud of Ghazni following his defeat of Jayapala in the Battle of Peshawar in 1001:

The Ghaznavid conquests were initially directed against the Ismaili Fatimids of Multan, who were engaged in an ongoing struggle with the provinces of the Abbasid Caliphate in conjunction with their compatriots of the Fatimid Caliphate in North Africa and the Middle East; Mahmud apparently hoped to curry the favor of the Abbasids in this fashion. However, once this aim was accomplished, he moved onto the looting of Indian temples and monasteries. By 1027 AD, Mahmud had captured parts of North India and obtained formal recognition of Ghazni's sovereignty from the Abbasid Caliph, al-Qadir Billah.

Ghaznavid's rule in Northwestern India (modern Afghanistan and Pakistan) lasted over for 175 years, from 1010 to 1187. It was during this period that Lahore assumed considerable importance, apart from being the second capital, and later the only capital of the Ghaznavid Empire.

At the end of his reign, Mahmud's empire extended from Kurdistan in the west to Samarkand in the Northeast, and from the Caspian Sea to the Punjab in the west. Although his raids carried his forces across Northern and Western India, only Punjab came under his permanent rule while Kashmir, the Doab, Rajasthan, and Gujarat remained nominal under the control of the local Indian dynasties. In 1030, Mahmud fell gravely ill and died at age 59. As with the invaders of three centuries ago, Mahmud's armies reached temples in Varanasi, Mathura, Ujjain, Maheshwar, Jwalamukhi, Somnath and Dwarka.

Ghurid Empire

Mu'izz al-Din, better known as Shahāb-ud-Din Muhammad Ghori was a conqueror from the region of Ghor in modern Afghanistan. Before 1160, the Ghaznavid Empire covered an area running from central Iran east to the Punjab, with capitals at Ghazni on the banks of Ghazni river in present-day Afghanistan, and at Lahore in present-day Pakistan. In 1173, Muhammad of Ghor was crowned Ghazni. In 1186, he conquered Lahore ending the Ghaznavid empire and bringing the last of Ghaznavid territory under his control. His early campaigns in the Indian Subcontinent were against the Qarmatians of Multan.

In 1191, he invaded the territory of Prithviraj III of Ajmer, who ruled his territory from Delhi to Ajmer in present-day Rajasthan, but was defeated at the First Battle of Tarain. The following year, Mu'izz al-Din assembled 120,000 horsemen and once again invaded India. Mu'izz al-Din's army met Prithviraj's army again at Tarain, and this time Mu'izz al-Din won; Govindraj was slain, Prithviraj executed and Mu'izz al-Din advanced onto Delhi. Within a year, Mu'izz al-Din controlled North-Western Rajasthan and Northern Ganges-Yamuna Doab. After these victories in India, and Mu'izz al-Din's establishment Delhi as the capital of his Indian provinces, Multan was also incorporated as a major part of his empire. Mu'izz al-Din then returned east to Ghazni to deal with the threat on his eastern frontiers from the Turks of the Khwarizmian Empire, whiles his armies continued to advance through Northern India, raiding as far as Bengal.

Mu'izz al-Din returned to Lahore after 1200. In 1206, Mu'izz al-Din had to travel to Lahore to crush a revolt. On his way back to Ghazni, his caravan rested at Damik near Sohawa (which is near the city of Jhelum in the Punjab province of modern-day Pakistan). He was assassinated on 15 March 1206, while offering his evening prayers by the assassins from the Ismaili Muslim sect.

Third phase (13th to 16th centuries)

Delhi Sultanate

Muhammad's Ghorid successors established the first dynasty of the Delhi Sultanate, while the Mamluk Dynasty in 1211 (however, the Delhi Sultanate is traditionally held to have been founded in 1206) seized the reins of the empire. Mamluk means "slave" and referred to the Turkic slave soldiers who became rulers. The territory under control of the Muslim rulers in Delhi expanded rapidly. Especially after the Mongol invasions of the thirteenth century, the opposition of Hindu and Muslim (Persian Musulman) became proverbial. According to Minhaj-i Siraj:
The East fell under the sway of the Mongols, and that the authority of the Muhammadan religion departed from those regions, which became the seat of paganism...The kingdom of Hindustan, by the grace of almighty God, and the favour of fortune, under the shade of the protection of the Iltutmishi dynnasty, became the focus of the people of Islam, and the orbit of the posessors of religion.

However, the Mamluk dynasty did not make fresh conquests, because their entire attention was devoted to the establishment of order to the infant state in northern India. Five ethnically different dynasties ruled from Delhi: the Mamluk (1206–1290), the Khalji (1290–1320), the Tughlaq (1320–1414), the Sayyid (1414–51), and the Lodhi (1451–1526). However, the main conquests under the Delhi Sultanate were led by the Khalji and Tughlaq dynasties, which penetrated deep into southern India. By the mid-century, Bengal and much of central India was under the Delhi Sultanate.

Alai Invasions
The Alai Revolution marked the transfer of power from the monopoly of Mamluk nobles to an Indo-Muslim nobility. Strengthened due to the ever-growing number of converts, the Khalji and Indo-Muslim faction took power through a series of assassinations. The new nobles who rose to power were Indian Muslims such as Zafar Khan(Minister of War), Nusrat Khan (Wazir of Delhi), Ayn al Mulk Multani, Malik Karfur, Malik Tughlaq, and Malik Nayk(Master of the Horse) who were famous warriors but non-Turks, which resulted in the emergence of an Indo-Muslim state. The internal administrative changes during this period allowed for rapid conquests and territorial expansion of the Sultanate into the rest of India. The general Ayn al-Mulk Multani led an army to conquer the Paramara kingdom of Malwa. Its Rai defended it with a large Rajput army, but he was defeated by Multani who became the governor of the province. Nusrat Khan Jalesari attacked Chaulukya dynasty and annexed Gujarat into the Delhi Sultanate. Nusrat Khan plundered its chief cities and sacked its temples, such as the famous temple of Somnath which had been rebuilt in the twelfth century. It was here where Nusrat Khan captured Malik Kafur who would later become a military general. The generals such as Malik Kafur and Khusraw Khan conquered southern India from which they collected large war booty (Anwatan). The Indian Muslim general Zafar Khan defeated the Mongols in the battle of Jaran Manjur, Sehwan and Killi.

Tughlaq Invasions

The Tughlaqs conquered Delhi with the support of the Khokhar tribes who formed the vanguard of the army. The Tughlaqs claimed to be "bound to all Indians by ties of blood and relation". Under the first ruler of the dynasty, Ghiyath al-Din Tughlaq, the Tughlaq court wrote a war ballad known as the Vaar in the Punjabi language, describing the introduction of Ghazi Malik's rise to the throne. This was the earliest known Vaar in Punjabi poetry. The Tughalqs attacked and plundered Bengal, Malwa, Gujarat, Mahratta, Tilang, Kampila, Dhur-samundar, Mabar, Lakhnauti, Chittagong, Sunarganw and Tirhut. The Tughlaqs chose Daulatabad in southern India as the second administrative capital of the Delhi Sultanate. The Delhi Sultanate forced migration of the Muslim population of Delhi, including his royal family, the nobles, Syeds, Sheikhs and 'Ulema to settle in Daulatabad. The purpose of transferring the entire Muslim elite to Daulatabad was to act as propagandists who would adapt Islamic religious symbolism to the rhetoric of empire, and so the Sufis could by persuasion bring many of the inhabitants of the Deccan to become Muslim. These elite colonists from the capital of Delhi were Urdu-speakers, who carried the Urdu language to the Deccan. 

During the time of Delhi Sultanate, the Vijayanagara Empire resisted attempts of Delhi Sultanate to establish dominion in the Southern India, serving as a barrier against invasion by the Muslims.

The Sultans of Delhi enjoyed cordial, if superficial, relations with Muslim rulers in the Near East but owed them no allegiance. They based their laws on the Quran and the sharia and permitted non-Muslim subjects to practice their own religions if they paid the jizya (poll tax). They ruled from urban centers, while military camps and trading posts provided the nuclei for towns that sprang up in the countryside.

Perhaps the most significant contribution of the Sultanate was its temporary success in insulating the subcontinent from the potential devastation of the Mongol invasion from Central Asia in the 13th century, which nonetheless led to the capture of Afghanistan and western Pakistan by the Mongols (see the Ilkhanate Dynasty). Under the Sultanate, "Indo-Muslim" fusion left lasting monuments in architecture, music, literature, and religion. In addition it is surmised that the language of Urdu (literally meaning "horde" or "camp" in various Turkic dialects) was born during the Delhi Sultanate period as a result of the mingling of Sanskritic Hindi and the Persian, Turkish, Arabic favoured by the Muslim invaders of India.

The Sultanate suffered significantly from the sacking of Delhi in 1398 by Timur, but revived briefly under the Lodi Dynasty. This was the final dynasty of the Sultanate before it was conquered by Zahiruddin Babur in 1526, who subsequently founded the Mughal dynasty that ruled from the 16th to the 18th centuries.

Timur

Tīmūr bin Taraghay Barlas, known in the West as Tamerlane or "Timur the lame", was a 14th-century warlord of Turco-Mongol descent. He had conquered much of western and central Asia, and founded the Timurid Empire (1370–1507) in Central Asia which survived until 1857 as the Mughal dynasty of India.

Informed about civil war in South Asia, Timur began a trek starting in 1398 to invade the reigning Sultan Nasir-u Din Mehmud of the Tughlaq Dynasty in the north Indian city of Delhi. His campaign was politically pretexted that the Muslim Delhi Sultanate was too tolerant toward its "Hindu" subjects, but that could not mask the real reason being to amass the wealth of the Delhi Sultanate.

Timur crossed the Indus River at Attock (now Pakistan) on 24 September. In Haryana, his soldiers killed about 50 to 100 Hindu civilians each.

Timur's invasion did not go unopposed, however, and he did meet some resistance during his march to Delhi, most notably with the Sarv Khap coalition in northern India, as well as the Governor of Meerut. Although impressed and momentarily stalled by the valour of Ilyaas Awan, Timur was able to continue his relentless approach to Delhi, arriving in 1398 to combat the armies of Sultan Mehmud, already weakened by an internal battle for ascension within the royal family.

The Sultan's army was easily defeated on 17 December 1398. Timur entered Delhi and the city was sacked, destroyed, and left in ruins. Before the battle for Delhi, Timur executed more than 100,000 "Hindu" captives.

Timur himself recorded the invasions in his memoirs, which were collectively known as Tuzk-i-Timuri. Timur's purported autobiography, the Tuzk-e-Taimuri ("Memoirs of Temur") is a later fabrication, although most of the historical facts are accurate.

Historian Irfan Habib writes in "Timur in the Political Tradition and Historiography of Mughal India" that in the 14th century, the word "Hindu" (people of "Al-Hind", "Hind" being "India") included "both Hindus and Muslims" in religious connotations.

However, Timur purportedly states in his own autobiography that, during the 15-day massacre of Delhi, "Excepting the quarters of the sayyids, the 'ulama and the other Musalmans (Muslims), the whole city was sacked", thereby implying that Timur differentiated between the Muslims and non-Muslims during his sack of the city.

Timur left Delhi in approximately January 1399. In April he had returned to his own capital beyond the Oxus (Amu Darya). Immense quantities of spoils were taken from India. According to Ruy Gonzáles de Clavijo, 90 captured elephants were employed merely to carry precious stones looted from his conquest, which was used to erect a mosque at Samarkand – what historians today believe is the enormous Bibi-Khanym Mosque. Ironically, the mosque was constructed too quickly and suffered from disrepair within a few decades of its construction.

Regional sultanates

Kashmir was conquered by the Shah Mir dynasty in the 14th century. Regional kingdoms such as Bengal, Gujarat, Malwa, Khandesh, Jaunpur, and Bahmanis expanded at the expense of the Delhi Sultanate. Gaining conversions to Islam was easier under regional Sultanates.

Deccan sultanates

The term of Deccan Sultanates was used for five Muslim dynasties that ruled several late medieval Indian kingdoms, namely Adil Shahi Sultanate, Qutb Shahi Sultanate, Nizam Shahi Sultanate, Bidar Sultanate, and Berar Sultanate in South India. The Deccan Sultanates ruled the Deccan Plateau between the Krishna River and the Vindhya Range. These sultanates became independent during the separation of the Bahmani Sultanate, another Muslim empire.

The ruling families of all these five sultanates were of diverse origin; the Qutb Shahi dynasty of Golconda Sultanate was of Iranian Turkmen origin, the Barid Shahi dynasty of Bidar Sultanate being founded by a Georgian noble, the Adil Shahi dynasty of Bijapur Sultanate was founded by a Georgian slave while Nizam Shahi dynasty of Ahmadnagar Sultanate and Imad Shahi dynasty of Berar Sultanate were of Hindu lineage (Ahmadnagar being Brahmin and Berar being Kanarese).

Fourth phase (16th to 18th centuries)

Mughal Empire

India in the early 16th century presented a fragmented picture of rulers who lacked concern for their subjects and failed to create a common body of laws or institutions. Outside developments also played a role in shaping events. The circumnavigation of Africa by the Portuguese explorer Vasco da Gama in 1498 allowed Europeans to challenge Muslim control of the trading routes between Europe and Asia. In Central Asia and Afghanistan, shifts in power pushed Babur of the Timurid dynasty (in present-day Uzbekistan) southward, first to Kabul and then to the heart of Indian subcontinent. The dynasty he founded endured for more than three centuries.

Babur 

A descendant of both Genghis Khan and Timur, Babur combined strength and courage with a love of beauty, and military ability with cultivation. He concentrated on gaining control of Northwestern India, doing so in 1526 by defeating the last Lodhi Sultan in the First battle of Panipat, a town north of Delhi. Babur then turned to the tasks of persuading his Central Asian followers to stay on in India and of overcoming other contenders for power, like the Rajputs and the Afghans. He succeeded in both tasks but died shortly thereafter in 1530. The Mughal Empire was one of the largest centralized states in pre-modern history and was the precursor to the British Indian Empire.

Babur was followed by his great-grandson, Shah Jahan (1628–1658), builder of the Taj Mahal and other magnificent buildings. Two other towering figures of the Mughal era were Akbar (r. 1556–1605) and Aurangzeb (r. 1658–1707). Both rulers expanded the empire greatly and were able administrators. However, Akbar was known for his religious tolerance and administrative genius while Aurangzeb was a pious Muslim and fierce advocate of more orthodox Islam.

Aurangzeb 

While some rulers were zealous in their spread of Islam, others were relatively liberal. The Mughal emperor Akbar, an example of the latter established a new religion, Din E Elahi, which included beliefs from different faiths and even build many temples in his empire. He abolished the jizya twice. In contrast, his great-grandson Aurangazeb was a more religious and orthodox ruler. Aurangzeb's Deccan campaign saw one of the largest death tolls in South Asian history, with an estimated 4.6 million people killed during his reign, Muslims and Hindus alike. An estimated of 2.5 million of Aurangzeb's army were killed during the Mughal–Maratha Wars (100,000 annually during a quarter-century), while 2 million civilians in war-torn lands died due to drought, plague and famine.
In the century-and-a-half that followed the death of Aurangzeb, effective Muslim control started weakening. Succession to imperial and even provincial power, which had often become hereditary, was subject to intrigue and force. The mansabdari system gave way to the zamindari system, in which high-ranking officials took on the appearance of hereditary landed aristocracy with powers of collecting rents. As Delhi's control waned, other contenders for power emerged and clashed, thus preparing the way for the eventual British takeover.

Durrani Empire

Ahmed Shah Abdali – a Pashtun – embarked on conquest in South Asia starting in 1747. In the short time of just over a quarter of a century, he forged one of the largest Muslim empires of the 18th century. The high point of his conquests was his victory over the powerful Marathas in the Third Battle of Panipat, which occurred in 1761. In the Indian subcontinent, his empire stretched from the Indus at Attock all the way to the eastern Punjab. Uninterested in long-term of conquest or in replacing the Mughal Empire, he became increasingly pre occupied with revolts by the Sikhs. Vadda Ghalughara took place under the Muslim provincial government based at Lahore to wipe out the Sikhs, with non-combatant women, children and old men being killed, an offensive that had begun with the Mughals, with the Chhota Ghallughara. but after two months Sikh Misls again assembled and defeated Durranis in Battle of Harnaulgarh, Sikhs Capture Sirhind Labore Multan His empire began to unravel decade before his death in 1772.

Decline of the Muslim rule

Maratha Empire

The single most important power to emerge in the Mughal dynasty was the Maratha Confederacy (1674–1818). The Marathas are responsible, to a large extent        for ending Mughal rule in India. The Maratha Empire ruled large parts of India following the decline of the Mughals. The long and futile war bankrupted one of the most powerful empires in the world. Mountstuart Elphinstone termed this a demoralizing period for the Muslims as many of them lost the will to fight against the Maratha Empire. The Maratha empire at its peak stretched from Trichinopoly (present day Tiruchirappalli in Tamil Nadu) in the south to the Afghan border in the north. In early 1771, Mahadji, a notable Maratha general, recaptured Delhi and installed Shah Alam II as the puppet ruler on the Mughal throne. In north India, the Marathas thus regained the territory and the prestige lost as result of the defeat at Panipath in 1761. Mahadji ruled Punjab and Sikh sardars (leaders) and Rajas of the Cis-Sutlej region paid him tribute. A considerable portion of the Indian subcontinent came under the sway of the British Empire after the Third Anglo-Maratha War, which ended the Maratha Empire in 1818.

Sikh Empire

In northwest India, Punjab, Sikhs developed themselves into a powerful force under the authority of twelve Misls. By 1801, Ranjit Singh captured Lahore and threw off the Afghan yoke from North West India. In Afghanistan Zaman Shah Durrani was defeated by powerful Barakzai chief Fateh Khan who appointed Mahmud Shah Durrani as the new ruler of Afghanistan and appointed himself as Wazir of Afghanistan. Sikhs however were now superior to the Afghans and started to annex Afghan provinces. The biggest victory of the Sikh Empire over the Durrani Empire came in the Battle of Attock fought in 1813 between Sikh and Wazir of Afghanistan Fateh Khan and his younger brother Dost Mohammad Khan. The Afghans were routed by the Sikh army and the Afghans lost over 9,000 soldiers in this battle. Dost Mohammad was seriously injured whereas his brother Wazir Fateh Khan fled back to Kabul fearing that his brother was dead. In 1818 they slaughtered Afghans and Muslims in trading city of Multan killing Afghan governor Nawab Muzzafar Khan and five of his sons in the Siege of Multan. In 1819 the last Indian Province of Kashmir was conquered by Sikhs who registered another crushing victory over weak Afghan General Jabbar Khan.

Impact on India, Islam and Muslims in India

Considering the complex history of the Muslim conquests of India, their recollection and legacy is controversial.

20th-century American historian Will Durant wrote about medieval India, "The Islamic conquest of India is probably the bloodiest story in history."

In contrast, there are other historians such as American historian Audrey Truschke and Indian historian Romila Thapar, who claim that such views are unfounded or exaggerated.

Conversion theories

Considerable controversy exists both in scholarly and public opinion about the conversions to Islam typically represented by the following schools of thought:

 The bulk of Muslims are descendants of migrants from the Iranian Plateau or Arabs.
 Conversions occurred for non-religious reasons of pragmatism and patronage such as social mobility among the Muslim ruling elite or for relief from taxes.
 Conversion was a result of the actions of Sunni Sufi saints and involved a genuine change of heart.
 Conversion came from Buddhists and the en masse conversions of lower castes for social liberation and as a rejection of the oppressive Hindu caste strictures.
 A combination, initially made under duress followed by a genuine change of heart.
 As a socio-cultural process of diffusion and integration over an extended period of time into the sphere of the dominant Muslim civilisation and global polity at large.

Embedded within this lies the concept of Islam as a foreign imposition and Hinduism being a natural condition of the natives who resisted, resulting in the failure of the project to Islamize the Indian subcontinent and is highly embroiled within the politics of the partition and communalism in India.

Historians such as Will Durant described Islamic invasions of India as "The bloodiest story in history. Jadunath Sarkar contends that several Muslim invaders were waging a systematic jihad against Hindus in India to the effect that "Every device short of massacre in cold blood was resorted to in order to convert heathen subjects".

Hindus who converted to Islam however were not completely immune to persecution due to the caste system among Muslims in India established by Ziauddin al-Barani in the Fatawa-i Jahandari, where they were regarded as an "Ajlaf" caste and subjected to discrimination by the "Ashraf" castes. Others argue that, during the Muslim conquests in the Indian subcontinent, Indian-origin religions experienced persecution from various Muslim conquerors who massacred Hindus, Jains and Buddhists, attacked temples and monasteries, and forced conversions on the battlefield.

Disputers of the "conversion by the sword theory" point to the presence of the large Muslim communities found in Southern India, Sri Lanka, Western Burma, Bangladesh, Southern Thailand, Indonesia, Malaysia and the Philippines coupled with the distinctive lack of equivalent Muslim communities around the heartland of historical Muslim empires in the Indian subcontinent as a refutation to the "conversion by the sword theory". The legacy of the Muslim conquest of South Asia is a hotly debated issue and argued even today.

Muslim invaders were not all simply raiders. Later rulers fought on to win kingdoms and stayed to create new ruling dynasties. The practices of these new rulers and their subsequent heirs (some of whom were born to Hindu wives) varied considerably. While some were uniformly hated, others developed a popular following. According to the memoirs of Ibn Battuta who travelled through Delhi in the 14th century, one of the previous sultans had been especially brutal and was deeply hated by Delhi's population. Batuta's memoirs also indicate that Muslims from the Arab world, Persia and Anatolia were often favoured with important posts at the royal courts, suggesting that locals may have played a somewhat subordinate role in the Delhi administration. The term "Turk" was commonly used to refer to their higher social status. S.A.A. Rizvi (The Wonder That Was India – II) however points to Muhammad ibn Tughluq as not only encouraging locals but promoting artisan groups such as cooks, barbers and gardeners to high administrative posts. In his reign, it is likely that conversions to Islam took place as a means of seeking greater social mobility and improved social standing.

Numerous temples were destroyed by Muslim conquerors. Richard M. Eaton lists a total of 80 temples that were desecrated by Muslim conquerors, but notes this was not unusual in medieval India where numerous temples were also desecrated by Hindu and Buddhist kings against rival Indian kingdoms during conflicts between devotees of different Hindu deities, and between Hindus, Buddhists and Jains. He also notes there were many instances of the Delhi Sultanate, which often had Hindu ministers, ordering the protection, maintenance and repairing of temples, according to both Muslim and Hindu sources, and that attacks on temples had significantly declined under the Mughal Empire.

K. S. Lal, in his book Growth of Muslim Population in Medieval India, claimed that between 1000 and 1500 the Indian population decreased by 30 million, but stated his estimates were tentative and did not claim any finality. His work has come under criticism by historians such as Simon Digby (SOAS, University of London) and Irfan Habib for its agenda and lack of accurate data in pre-census times. Different population estimates by economics historians Angus Maddison and Jean-Noël Biraben also indicate that India's population did not decrease between 1000 and 1500, but increased by about 35 million during that time. The Indian population estimates from other economic historians including Colin Clark, John D. Durand and Colin McEvedy also show there was a population increase in India between 1000 and 1500.

Expansion of trade

Islam's impact was the most notable in the expansion of trade. The first contact of Muslims with India was the Arab attack on a nest of pirates near modern-day Mumbai to safeguard their trade in the Arabian Sea. Around the same time, many Arabs settled at Indian ports- giving rise to small Muslim communities. The growth of these communities was not only due to conversion but also the fact that many Hindu kings of south India (such as those from Cholas) hired Muslims as mercenaries.

A significant aspect of the Muslim period in world history was the emergence of Islamic Sharia courts capable of imposing a common commercial and legal system that extended from Morocco in the West to Mongolia in the North East and Indonesia in the South East. While southern India was already in trade with Arabs/Muslims, northern India found new opportunities. As the Hindu and Buddhist kingdoms of Asia were subjugated by Islam, and as Islam spread through Africa, it became a highly centralising force that facilitated in the creation of a common legal system that allowed letters of credit issued in say Egypt or Tunisia to be honoured in India or Indonesia (sharia has laws on the transaction of business with both Muslims and non-Muslims). To cement their rules, Muslim rulers initially promoted a system in which there was a revolving door between the clergy, the administrative nobility and the mercantile classes. The travels of explorer Muhammad Ibn-Abdullah Ibn-Batuta were eased because of this system. He served as an Imam in Delhi, as a judicial official in the Maldives, and as an envoy and trader in the Malabar. There was never a contradiction in any of his positions because each of these roles complemented the other. Islam created a compact under which political power, law and religion became fused in a manner so as to safeguard the interests of the mercantile class. This led world trade to expand to the maximum extent possible in the medieval world. Sher Shah Suri took initiatives in improvement of trade by abolishing all taxes which hindered progress of free trade. He built large networks of roads and constructed Grand Trunk Road (1540–1544), which connects Chittagong to Kabul; parts of it are still in use today. The geographic regions add to the diversity of languages and politics.

Cultural influence

The divide and rule policies, two-nation theory, and subsequent partition of British India in the wake of Independence from the British Empire has polarised the sub-continental psyche, making objective assessment hard in comparison to the other settled agricultural societies of India from the North West. Muslim rule differed from these others in the level of assimilation and syncretism that occurred. They retained their identity and introduced legal and administrative systems that superseded existing systems of social conduct and ethics. While this was a source of friction it resulted in a unique experience the legacy of which is a Muslim community strongly Islamic in character while at the same time distinctive and unique among its peers.

The impact of Islam on Indian culture has been inestimable. It permanently influenced the development of all areas of human endeavour – language, dress, cuisine, all the art forms, architecture and urban design, and social customs and values. Conversely, the languages of the Muslim invaders were modified by contact with local languages, to Urdu, which uses the Arabic script. This language was also known as Hindustani, an umbrella term used for the vernacular terminology of Hindi as well as Urdu, both major languages in South Asia today derived primarily from Sanskrit grammatical structures and vocabulary.

Muslim rule saw a greater urbanisation of India and the rise of many cities and their urban cultures. The biggest impact was upon trade resulting from a common commercial and legal system extending from Morocco to Indonesia. This change of emphasis on mercantilism and trade from the more strongly centralised governance systems further clashed with the agricultural based traditional economy and also provided fuel for social and political tensions.

A related development to the shifting economic conditions was the establishment of Karkhanas, or small factories and the import and dissemination of technology through India and the rest of the world. The use of ceramic tiles was adopted from architectural traditions of Iraq, Iran, and Central Asia. Rajasthan's blue pottery was a local variation of imported Chinese pottery. There is also the example of Sultan Abidin (1420–1470) sending Kashmiri artisans to Samarqand to learn book-binding and paper making. Khurja and Siwan became renowned for pottery, Moradabad for brass ware, Mirzapur for carpets, Firozabad for glass wares, Farrukhabad for printing, Sahranpur and Nagina for wood-carving, Bidar and Lucknow for bidriware, Srinagar for papier-mache, Benaras for jewellery and textiles, and so on. On the flip-side encouraging such growth also resulted in higher taxes on the peasantry.

Numerous Indian scientific and mathematical advances and the Hindu numerals were spread to the rest of the world and much of the scholarly work and advances in the sciences of the age under Muslim nations across the globe were imported by the liberal patronage of Arts and Sciences by the rulers. The languages brought by Islam were modified by contact with local languages leading to the creation of several new languages, such as Urdu, which uses the modified Arabic script, but with more Persian words. The influences of these languages exist in several dialects in India today.

Islamic and Mughal architecture and art is widely noticeable in India, examples being the Taj Mahal and Jama Masjid. At the same time, Muslim rulers destroyed many of the ancient Indian architectural marvels and converted them into Islamic structures, most notably at Varanasi, Mathura, Ayodhya and the Kutub Complex in New Delhi.

Migration of Hindus

Few groups of Hindus including Rajputs were entering what is today Nepal before the fall of Chittor due to regular invasions of Muslims in India. After the fall of Chittorgarh in 1303 by the Alauddin Khilji of the Khalji dynasty, Rajputs from the region immigrated in large groups into what is today Nepal due to heavy religious persecution. The incident is supported by both the Rajput and Nepalese traditions.  Historian John T Hitchcock and John Whelpton contends that the regular invasions by Muslims led to heavy influx of Rajputs with Brahmins from the 12th century.

The entry of Rajputs in central region of what is today Nepal were easily assisted by Khas Malla rulers who had developed a large feudatory state covering more than half of the Greater Nepal. The Hindu immigrants including Rajputs were mixed into the Khas society quickly as a result of much resemblance. Also, the Magar tribesmen of the Western region of what is today Nepal welcomed the immigrant Rajput chiefs with much cordiality.

Religious policies

General effect
Parts of India have been subject to Muslim rule from the period of Muhammad ibn Qasim till the fall of the Mughal Empire. While there is a tendency to view the Muslim conquests and Muslim empires as a prolonged period of violence against Hindu culture, in between the periods of wars and conquests, there were harmonious Hindu-Muslim relations in most Indian communities, and the Indian population grew during the medieval Muslim times. No populations were expelled based on their religion by either the Muslim or Hindu kings, nor were attempts made to annihilate a specific religion.

According to Romila Thapar, with the onset of Muslim rule all Indians, higher and lower caste were lumped together in the category of "Hindus". While higher-caste Indians regarded lower castes to be impure, they were now regarded as belonging to a similar category, which partly explains the belief among many higher caste Indians "Hinduism in the last one thousand years has been through the most severe persecution that any religion in the world has ever undergone." Thapar further notes that "The need to exaggerate the persecution at the hands of the Muslim is required to justify the inculcation of anti-Muslim sentiments among the Hindus of today." Hindutva-allies have even framed the Muslim violence against Hindu expressions of faith as a "Hindu Holocaust".

Romila Thapar states that the belief in a severe persecution in the last millennium brushes away the "various expressions of religious persecution in India prior to the coming of the Muslims and particularly between the Śaiva and the Buddhist and Jaina sects". She questions what persecution means, and if it means religious conversions, she doubts that conversions can be interpreted as forms of persecution. It is quite correct to mention that Muslim iconoclasts destroyed temples and the broke images of Hindus, states Thapar, it should also be mentioned that Muslim rulers made donations to Hindu sects during their rule.

During the Islamic rule period, states David Lorenzen, there was state-sponsored persecution against Hindus, yet it was sporadic and directed mostly at Hindu religious monuments. According to Deepa Ollapally, the Mughal emperor Aurangzeb was clearly discriminatory towards Hindu and all other non-Muslims, displaying an "unprecedented level of religious bigotry", but perhaps this was a consequence of the opposition he faced from a number of his family members. During the medieval span, she states, "episodes of direct religious persecution of Hindus were rare", as were communal riots between Hindus and Muslims.

Destruction of religious architecture
According to Wink, the mutilation and destruction of Hindu religious idols and temples were an attack on Hindu religious practice, and the Muslim destruction of religious architecture was a means to eradicate the vestiges of Hindu religious symbols. Muslim texts of this period justify it based on their contempt and abhorence for idols and idolators in Islamic thought. Jackson notes that the Muslim historians of the medieval era viewed the creation and expansion of Islamic Sultanates in Hindustan as "holy war" and a religious conquest, characterizing Muslim forces as "the army of Islam" and the Hindus as infidels. Yet, states Jackson, these records need to be interpreted and relied upon with care given their tendencies to exaggerate. This was not a period of "uncompromising iconoclasm", states Jackson. Cities that quickly surrendered to the Islamic army, says Jackson, "got a better deal" for their religious monuments.

According to Richard Davis, targeting sacred temples was not unique to Muslim rulers in India. Some Hindu kings too, prior to the formation of first Islamic sultanates in India, expropriated sacred idols from temples and took it back to their capitals as a political symbol of victory. However, the sacred temples, icons and the looted image carried away was still sacred and treated with respect by the victorious Hindu king and his forces, states Richard Davis. There is hardly any evidence of "mutilation of divine images and intentional defilement" of Hindu sacred icons or temples by armies in control of Hindu rulers. The evidence that is available suggests that the victorious Hindu kings undertook significant effort to house the expropriated images in new, grand temples within their kingdom. According to Wink, Hindu destruction of Buddhist and Jain places of worship took place before the 10th century, but the evidence for such 'Hindu iconoclasm' is incidental, too vague, and unconvincing. According to Wink, mutilation and defilement of sacred icons is rarely evidenced in Hindu texts, in contrast to Muslim texts on the Islamic iconoclasm in India. Hindu temples were centres of political resistance which had to be suppressed.

Effect on Hindu learning
The destruction of temples and educational institutions, the killings of learned monks and the scattering of students, led to a widespread decline in Hindu education. With the fall of Hindu kings, science research and philosophy faced some setbacks due to a lack of funding, royal support, and an open environment. Despite unfavourable treatment under the Muslim rule, Brahmanical education continued and was also patronised by rulers like Akbar and others. Bukka Raya I, one of the founders of Vijaynagar Empire, had taken steps to rehabilitate Hindu religious and cultural institutions which suffered a serious setback under Muslim rule. Buddhists centres of learning decayed, leading to the rise to prominence of Brahmanical institutions.

While Sanskrit language and research on Vedantic philosophy faced a period of struggle, with Muslim rulers often targeting well-established and well-known educational institutions that were often suffering at the time, the traditional educational institutions in villages continued as before, vernacular regional languages based on Sanskrit thrived. A lot of Vedantic literature got translated into these languages between 12th to 15th centuries.

Muhammad bin-Qasim and the Chachnama
Muslim conquest of the Indian subcontinent began in early 8th century AD with a Muhammad ibn Qasim-led army. This campaign is narrated in the 13th-century surviving manuscript of Chach Nama by Bakr Kūfī, which was claimed to be based on an earlier Arabic record.

Content
The Chach Nama mentions temple demolitions, mass executions of resisting Sindhi forces and the enslavement of their dependents; kingdoms ruled by Hindu and Buddhist kings were attacked, their wealth plundered, tribute (kharaj) settled and hostages taken, often as slaves to Iraq. According to André Wink, a historian specializing in Indo-Islamic period in South Asia, these Hindus were given the choice to either convert to Islam and join the Arab armies, or be sealed (tattooing the hands) and pay Jizya (a tax). The Chach Nama and evidence in other pre-11th century Persian texts suggests that these Hindu Jats also suffered restrictions and discrimination as non-Muslims, as was then usual elsewhere for the non-Muslim subjects (ahl adh-dhimma) per the Islamic law (Sharia), states Wink.

Yohanan Friedmann however finds that Chachnama holds most of the contemporary religious as well as political authority to have collaborated with the invaders, and those who promptly surrendered were not only gifted with huge sums of money but also entrusted to rule conquered territories. Friedmann also notes that bin-Qasim "gave his unqualified blessing to the characteristic features of the society"—he reappointed every deposed Brahmin (of Brahmanabad) to their jobs, exempted them from Jizya, allowed holding of traditional festivals, and granted protection to temples but enforced the caste-hierarchy with enhanced vigor, drawing from Sharia, as evident from his treatment of Jats. Overall, Friedmann concludes that the conquest, as described in the Chach Nama, did "not result in any significant changes in the structure of Indian society".

According to Johnson and Koyama, quoting Bosworth, there were "certainly massacres in the towns" in the early stages of campaign against pagan Hindus in Sind, but eventually they were granted dhimmi status and peace treaties were made with them.

After the conquest of Sindh, Qasim chose the Hanafi school of Islamic law which stated that, when under Muslim rule, people of Indic religions such as Hindus, Buddhists, and Jains are to be regarded as dhimmis (from the Arab term) as well as "People of the Book" and are required to pay jizya for religious freedom.

Doubtful source
The historicity of Chachnama has been questioned. Francesco Gabrieli considers the Chach Nama to be a "historical romance" which was "a late and doubtful source" for information about bin-Qasim and must be carefully sieved to locate the facts; on such a reading, he admired bin-Qasim's proclamations concerning "principle of tolerance and religious freedom".
Peter Hardy takes a roughly similar stance and lenses the work as a work of "political theory".
Manan Ahmed Asif criticizes the very premises of recovering portions of Chachnama as a historical chronicle of Muslim conquest; he argues that the site and times of production dictated its entire content, and that it must be read in entirety, as an original work in the genre of "political theory" where history is creatively extrapolated with romantic fiction to gain favor in the court of Nasiruddin Qabacha.
Wink states that some scholars treat Chachnama and other Muslim texts of its era, as "largely pseudo-history". He concurs that the skepticism about each individual source is justified and Chachnama is part fiction. Yet, adds Wink, taken together the common elements in these diverse sources suggest that Hindus were treated as dhimmis and targeted for certain discriminatory measures prescribed in the Sharia, as well as entitled to protection and limited religious freedoms in a Muslim state.

Early sultanates (11th–12th century)
Muslim texts of that period are replete with iconoclast rhetoric, descriptions of mass-slaughter of Hindus, and repeats ad nauseam about "the army of Islam obtain[ing] abundant wealth and unlimited riches" from the conquered sites. The Hindus are described in these Islamic texts as infidels, Hindustan as war zone ("Dar-al-Harb"), and attacks on pagan Hindus as a part of a holy war (jihad), states Peter Jackson. However, states Wink, this killing was not systematic and "was normally confined to the fighting men" though the wars and episodes of routine violence did precipitate a great famine with civilian casualties in tens of thousands. The pervasive and most striking feature of the Arabic literature on Sind and Hind of the 11th to 13th-century is its constant obsession with idol worship and polytheism in the Indian subcontinent. There is piecemeal evidence of iconoclasm that began in Sind region, but the wholesale and more systematic onslaught against major Hindu religious monuments is evidenced in North India.

Richard Eaton, Sunil Kumar, Romila Thapar, Richard H. Davis and others argue that these iconoclastic actions were not primarily driven by religious zeal, but were politically strategic acts of destruction in that temples in medieval India were sites associated with sovereignty, royal power, money, and authority. According to Wink, the iconoclasm was a product of "religious, economic and political" and the practice undoubtedly escalated due to the "vast amount of immobilized treasure" in these temples. As the Indo-Islamic conquests of the 11th and 12th centuries moved beyond Panjab and the Himalayan foothills of the northwest into the Ganges-Yamuna Doab region, states Andre Wink, "some of the most important sacred sites of Indian culture were destroyed and desecrated," and their broken parts consistently reused to make Islamic monuments. Phyllis Granoff notes that "medieval Indian religious groups faced a serious crisis as invading Muslim armies sacked temples and defaced sacred image".

The 11th and 12th centuries additionally witnessed the rise of irregulars and then Banjara-like groups who adopted Islam. These were "marauding bands" who caused much suffering and destruction in the countryside as they searched for food and supplies during the violent campaign of Ghurids against Hindustan. The religious icons of Hindus were one of the targets of these Islamic campaigns.

The 11th to 13th-century period did not witness any systematic attempts at forced conversions of Hindus into Muslims, nor is there evidence of widespread Islamicization in al-Hind that emerged from the violent conquest. The political power shifted from Hindu kings to Muslim sultans in conquered areas. If some temples were not destroyed in these areas, it did result in a loss to Hindu temple building patronage and an uprooting of Hindu sacred geography.

The second half of the 13th-century witnessed raids on Hindu kingdoms by Muslim forces controlling the northwest and north India, states Peter Jackson. These did not lead to sustained persecution of the Hindus in the targeted kingdoms, because the Muslim armies merely looted the Hindus, took cattle and slaves, then left. The raids caused suffering, yet also rallied the Islamic faithfuls and weakened the infidel prince by weakening his standing among his Hindu subjects. These raids were into Rajput kingdoms, those in central India, Lakhnawti–Awadh, and in eastern regions such as Bihar.

Numerous Islamic texts of that era, states Wink, also describe "forced transfer of enslaved Indian captives (ghilman-o-jawari, burda, sabaya), specially women and children" over the 11th century from Hindustan.

Delhi Sultanate (13th–16th century)
The Delhi Sultanate started in the 13th-century and continued through the early 16th century, when the Mughal conquest replaced it. The Delhi Sultans of this period saw themselves first and foremost as Islamic rulers, states Peter Jackson, for the "people of Islam". They were emphatically not "sultan of the Hindus". The Muslim texts of the Delhi Sultanate era treated Hindus with disdain, remarking "Hindus are never interesting in themselves, but only as converts, as capitation tax payers, or as corpses". These medieval Muslim rulers were "protecting and advancing the Islamic faith", with two Muslim texts of this period remarking that the Sultan had a duty "eradicate infidelity and humiliate his Hindu subjects".

Some of the conquered Hindu subjects of the Delhi Sultanate served these Sultans, who states Jackson, were "doubtless usually slaves". These Hindus built the mosques of this era as well as developed the Indo-Islamic architecture, some served the court in roles such as treasurers, clerks, minting of new coins, and others. These Hindus were not persecuted, instead some were rewarded with immunities and tax exemptions. Additionally, captured Hindu slaves were added as infantry troops in the Sultanate's army for their campaign against other Hindu kingdoms. Some Sultans adopted Indian customs such as ceremonial riding of elephants by kings, thus facilitating the public perception of the new monarch. This suggest that the Sultans cultivated some Hindus to serve their aims, rather than indiscriminately persecute every Hindu.

In general, Hindu subjects of Delhi Sultanate were generally accepted as people with dhimmi status, not equal to Muslims, but "protected", subject to Jizya tax and with a list of restrictions. Early Sultans of the Delhi Sultanate exempted the Brahmins from having to pay Jizya, thus dividing the Hindus and placing the discriminatory tax burden entirely on the non-Brahmin strata of the Hindu society. Firuz Shah was the first to impose the Jizya on Brahmins, and wrote in his autobiography that countless Hindus converted to Islam when he issued the edict that conversion would release them of the requirement to pay Jizya. This discrimination against Hindus was in force in the latter half of the 14th century, states Jackson, yet it is difficult to establish if and how this was enforced outside of the major centers under Muslim control.

The Muslim commanders of Delhi Sultanate regularly raided Hindu kingdoms for plunder, mulct their treasuries and looted the Hindu temples therein, states Jackson. These conquests of Delhi Sultanate armies damaged or destroyed many Hindu temples. Yet, in a few instances, after the war, the Sultans let the Hindus repair and reconstruct their temples. Such instances, states Jackson, has been cited by the Indian scholar P.B. Desai as evidence of "striking degree of tolerance" by Muslim Sultans. But, this happened in frontier areas after they had recently been conquered and placed in direct Muslim rule, where the Sultan's authority was "highly precarious". Within regions that was already under firm control of the Delhi Sultanate, the direct evidence of this is meagre. One example referred to is of a claimed request from the king of China to build a temple in India, as recorded by Ibn Battuta. That is questionable and has no corroborating evidence, states Jackson. Similar few examples near Delhi, such as one for Sri Krishna Bhagwan temple, cannot be verified whether they were ever built either.

Some modern era Indian texts mention that Hindu and Jain temples of Delhi Sultanate era received endowments from Muslim authorities, presenting these as evidence of lack of persecution during this period. It is "not beyond the bounds of possibility" that in some instances this happened. But generally, states Jackson, the texts and even the memoirs written by the some Sultans themselves describe how they "set about destroying new temples and replacing them with mosques", and in one case depopulated a town of Hindus and resettled Muslims there. Jackson clarifies that the evidence suggests that the destroyed temples were "new temples", and not the old one's near Delhi whose devotees were already paying regular Jizya to the Sultan's treasuries. In some cases, the policies on destroying or letting Hindus worship in their old temples changed as Sultans changed.

The Muslim nobles and advisors of the Sultans championed persecution of Hindus. The Muslim texts of that era, states Jackson, frequently mention themes such as the Hindu "infidels must on no account be allowed to live in ease and affluence", they should not be treated as "Peoples of the Book" and the Sultan should "at least refrain from treating Hindus with honour or permitting idolatry in the capital". Failure to slaughter the Hindus has led to polytheism taking root. Another wazir while theoretically agreeing to these view, stated that this would not be practical given the small population of Muslims and such a policy should be deferred till Muslims were in a stronger position. If eradication of Hindus is not possible, suggested another Muslim official, then the Hindus should at least be insulted, disgraced and dishonored. These views were not exceptions, rather consistent with Islamic thinking of that era and are "commonly encountered in polemical writing against the infidel in different parts of the Islamic world at different times", states Jackson. This antagonism towards Hindus may have other general reasons, such as the fear of apostasy given the tendency of everyday Muslims to join in with Hindus as they celebrated their religious festivals. Further, the succession struggle after the death of a Sultan usually led to political maneuvering by the next Sultan, where depending on the circumstances, the victor championed either the orthodox segment of the Islamic clergy and jurists, or gave concessions to the Hindus and other groups for support when the Sultanate facing a military threat from outside.

Madurai Sultanate

First campaigns
The army of Ala al-Din Khalji from Delhi Sultanate began their first campaign in 1310 against the Hindu kingdom in Madurai region – called Ma'bar by court historians, under the pretext of helping Sundar Pandya. According to Mehrdad Shokoohy – a scholar of Islamic studies and architectural history in Central and South Asia – this campaign lasted for a year during which Madurai and other Tamil region cities were overrun by the Muslims, the Hindu temples were demolished and the towns looted. A detailed record about the campaign by Amir Khusrau the destruction and plunder.

A second destructive campaign was launched by Mubarak Shah, Ala al-Din Khalji's successor. While the looted wealth was sent to Delhi, a Muslim governor was appointed for the region. The governor later rebelled, founded the short lived Madurai Sultanate and renamed himself as Sultan Ahsan Shah in 1334. The successive sultans of the new Sultanate did not have the support of the regional Hindu population. The Madurai Sultanate's army, states Shokoohy, "often exercised fierce and brutal repressive methods on the local people". The Sultanate faced constant battles with neighboring Hindu states and assassination by its own nobles. Sultan Sikandar Shah was the last sultan. He was killed by the invading forces of Vijayanagara Empire army in 1377.

The Muslim literature of this period record the motive of the Madurai Sultans. For example, Sultan Shams al-Din Adil Shah's general is described as leaving for "holy war against the infidels and taking from them great wealth and a vast amount of booty". Another record states, "he engaged in a holy war (ghaza) and killed a great number of infidels". Madurai region has several Islamic shrines with tombs built during this period, such as one for Ala al-Din and Shams al-Din. In this shrine, the inner columns are irregular and vary in form showing evidence of "reused material". The "destruction of temples and the re-use of their materials", states Shokoohy, was a "practice of the early Sultanates of North India, and we may assume that this tradition was brought to the south by the sultans of Ma'bar".

The Madurai Sultanate "sacked and desecrated Hindu temples throughout the Tamil country", and these were restored and reconsecrated for worship by the Vijayanagara rulers, states the Indologist Crispin Branfoot.

Mughal Empire
The Mughal emperor Akbar has been a celebrated unusual example of tolerance. Indologist Richard Eaton writes that from Akbar's time to today, he has attracted conflicting labels, "from a strict Muslim to an apostate, from a free-thinker to a crypto-Hindu, from a Zoroastrian to a proto-Christian, from an atheist to a radical innovator". As a youth, states Eaton, Akbar studied Islam under both Shia and Sunni tutors, but as an adult he looked back with regret on his early life, confessing that in those days he had "persecuted men into conformity with my faith and deemed it Islam". In his later years he felt "an internal bitterness, acknowledging that his soul had been 'seized with exceeding sorrow for what he had done before launching his campaign to "treat all Mughal subjects, regardless of religion, on a basis of legal equality before the state".

Aurangzeb
The reign of Aurangzeb (1658-1707) witnessed one of the strongest campaigns of religious violence in the Mughal Empire's history. Aurangzeb is a controversial figure in modern India, often remembered as a "vile oppressor of Hindus". During his rule Aurangzeb expanded the Mughal Empire, conquering much of southern India through long bloody campaigns against non-Muslims. He forcibly converted Hindus to Islam and destroyed Hindu temples. He also re-introduced the jizya, a tax on non-Muslims, which had been suspended for the previous 100 years by his great-grandfather Akbar.

Aurangzeb ordered the desecration and destruction of temples when conquering new lands and putting down rebellions, punishing political leaders by destroying the temples that symbolized their power. In 1669 he issued orders to all his governors of provinces to "destroy with a willing hand the schools and temples of the infidels, and that they were strictly enjoined to put an entire stop to the teaching and practice of idolatrous forms of worship". According to Richard Eaton these orders appear to have been directed not toward Hindu temples in general, but towards a more narrowly defined "deviant group". The number of Hindu temples destroyed or desecrated under Aurangzeb's rule is unclear, but may have been grossly exaggerated, and he probably built more temples than he destroyed. According to Ikram, "Aurangzeb tried to enforce strict Islamic law by ordering the destruction of newly built Hindu temples. Later, the procedure was adopted of closing down rather than destroying the newly built temples in Hindu localities. It is also true that very often the orders of destruction remained a dead letter." Some temples were destroyed entirely; in other cases mosques were built on their foundations, sometimes using the same stones. Idols in temples were smashed, and the city of Mathura was temporarily renamed as Islamabad in local official documents. 
 
The persecution during the Islamic period targeted non-Hindus as well. In some cases, such as towards the end of Mughal era, the violence and persecution was mutual. Hindus too attacked and damaged Muslim tombs, even when the troops had orders not to harm religious refuges of Muslims. These "few examples of disrespect for Islamic sites", states Indologist Nicholas Gier, "pale in comparison to the great destruction of temples and general persecution of Hindus by Muslims for 500 years". Sources document brutal episodes of persecution. Sikh texts, for example, document their "Guru Teg Bahadur accompanying sixteen Hindu Brahmins on a quest to stop Mughal persecution of Hindus; they were arrested and commanded to convert to Islam on pain of torture and death", states Gier, "they all refused, and in November 1675, Mati Das was sawed in half, Dayal Das was boiled alive, Sati Das was burned alive, and Teg Bahadar was beheaded."

Iconoclasm

During the Muslim conquest of Sindh 
Records from the campaign recorded in the Chach Nama record the destruction of temples during the early 8th century when the Umayyad governor of Damascus, al-Hajjaj ibn Yusuf, mobilized an expedition of 6000 cavalry under Muhammad bin Qasim in 712.

Historian Upendra Thakur records the persecution of Hindus and Buddhists:

Iconoclasm under the Delhi Sultanate

Historian Richard Eaton has tabulated a campaign of destruction of idols and temples by Delhi Sultans, intermixed with instances of years where the temples were protected from desecration. In his paper, he has listed 37 instances of Hindu temples being desecrated or destroyed in India during the Delhi Sultanate, from 1234 to 1518, for which reasonable evidence is available. He noted that this was not unusual in medieval India, as there were numerous recorded instances of temple desecration by Hindu and Buddhist kings against rival Indian kingdoms between 642 and 1520, involving conflict between devotees of different Hindu deities, as well as between Hindus, Buddhists and Jains. He also noted there were also many instances of Delhi sultans, who often had Hindu ministers, ordering the protection, maintenance and repairing of temples, according to both Muslim and Hindu sources. For example, a Sanskrit inscription notes that Sultan Muhammad bin Tughluq repaired a Siva temple in Bidar after his Deccan conquest. There was often a pattern of Delhi sultans plundering or damaging temples during conquest, and then patronizing or repairing temples after conquest. This pattern came to an end with the Mughal Empire, where Akbar's chief minister Abu'l-Fazl criticized the excesses of earlier sultans such as Mahmud of Ghazni.

In many cases, the demolished remains, rocks and broken statue pieces of temples destroyed by Delhi sultans were reused to build mosques and other buildings. For example, the Qutb complex in Delhi was built from stones of 27 demolished Hindu and Jain temples by some accounts. Similarly, the Muslim mosque in Khanapur, Maharashtra was built from the looted parts and demolished remains of Hindu temples. Muhammad bin Bakhtiyar Khalji destroyed Buddhist and Hindu libraries and their manuscripts at Nalanda and Odantapuri Universities in 1193 AD at the beginning of the Delhi Sultanate.

The first historical record in this period of a campaign of destruction of temples and defacement of faces or heads of Hindu idols lasted from 1193 through 1194 in Rajasthan, Punjab, Haryana and Uttar Pradesh under the command of Ghuri. Under the Mamluks and Khaljis, the campaign of temple desecration expanded to Bihar, Madhya Pradesh, Gujarat and Maharashtra, and continued through the late 13th century. The campaign extended to Telangana, Andhra Pradesh, Karnataka and Tamil Nadu under Malik Kafur and Ulugh Khan in the 14th century, and by the Bahmanis in the 15th century. Orissa temples were destroyed in the 14th century under the Tughlaqs.

Beyond destruction and desecration, the sultans of the Delhi Sultanate in some cases had forbidden reconstruction or repair of damaged Hindu, Jain and Buddhist temples. In certain cases, the Sultanate would grant a permit for repairs and construction of temples if the patron or religious community paid jizya (fee, tax). For example, according to Ibn Battuta's account, a proposal by the Yuan dynasty emperor of China to repair Himalayan Buddhist temples destroyed by the Sultanate army was refused, on the grounds that such temple repairs were only allowed if the Chinese agreed to pay jizya tax to the treasury of the Sultanate. According to Eva De Clercq, an expert in the study of Jainism, the Delhi Sultans did not strictly prohibit construction of new temples in the sultanate, Islamic law notwithstanding. In his memoirs, Firoz Shah Tughlaq describes how he destroyed temples and built mosques instead and killed those who dared build new temples. Other historical records from wazirs, amirs and the court historians of various Sultans of the Delhi Sultanate describe the grandeur of idols and temples they witnessed in their campaigns and how these were destroyed and desecrated.

Nalanda

In 1193, the Nalanda University complex was destroyed by Afghan Khalji–Ghilzai Muslims under Bakhtiyar Khalji; this event is seen as the final milestone in the decline of Buddhism in India. He also burned Nalanda's major Buddhist library and Vikramshila University, as well as numerous Buddhist monasteries in India. When the Tibetan translator, Chag Lotsawa Dharmasvamin (Chag Lo-tsa-ba, 1197–1264), visited northern India in 1235, Nalanda was damaged, looted, and largely deserted, but still standing and functioning with seventy students.

Mahabodhi, Sompura, Vajrasan and other important monasteries were found to be untouched. The Ghuri ravages only afflicted those monasteries that lay in the direct path of their advance and were fortified in the manner of defensive forts.

By the end of the 12th century, following the Muslim conquest of the Buddhist stronghold in Bihar, Buddhism, having already declined in the South, declined in the North as well because survivors retreated to Nepal, Sikkim and Tibet or escaped to the South of the Indian sub-continent.

Martand

The Martand Sun Temple was built by the third ruler of the Karkota dynasty, Lalitaditya Muktapida, in the 8th century AD. The temple was completely destroyed on the orders of the Muslim ruler Sikandar Butshikan in the early 15th century, with demolition lasting a year. He ruled from 1389 to 1413 and is remembered for his strenuous efforts to convert the Hindus of Kashmir to Islam. These efforts included the destruction of numerous old temples, such as Martand, prohibition of Hindu rites, rituals and festivals and even the wearing of clothes in the Hindu style. He is known as "Butcher of Kashmir" and among the most hated figures among Kashmiri Hindus.

Vijayanagara

The city flourished between the 14th century and 16th century, during the height of the Vijayanagara Empire. During this time, it was often in conflict with the kingdoms which rose in the Northern Deccan, and which are often collectively termed the Deccan Sultanates. The Vijaynagara Empire successfully resisted Muslim invasions for centuries. But in 1565, the empire's armies suffered a massive and catastrophic defeat at the hands of an alliance of the Sultanates, and the capital was taken. The victorious armies then razed, depopulated and destroyed the city over several months. The empire continued its slow decline, but the original capital was not reoccupied or rebuilt.

Somnath

Around 1024 AD, during the reign of Bhima I, Mahmud of Ghazni raided Gujarat, and plundered the Somnath temple. According to an 1169 inscription, Bhima rebuilt the temple. This inscription does not mention any destruction caused by Mahmud, and states that the temple had "decayed due to time". In 1299, Alauddin Khalji's army under the leadership of Ulugh Khan defeated Karandev II of the Vaghela dynasty, and sacked the Somnath temple.  In 1665, the temple, was once again ordered to be destroyed by Mughal emperor Aurangzeb. In 1702, he ordered that if Hindus had revived worship there, it should be demolished completely.

See also

 History of Afghanistan
 History of India
 History of Pakistan
 History of Bangladesh
 History of Islam
 Islam and other religions
 Muslim kingdoms in the Indian subcontinent
 Ghazwa-e-Hind
 List of early Hindu–Muslim military conflicts in the Indian subcontinent
 Muslim conquests of Afghanistan
 Decline of Buddhism in the Indian subcontinent
 Mughal–Maratha Wars (1680–1707)
 Ahom–Mughal conflicts (1615–1682)
 Aniconism
 Aniconism in Islam
 Iconoclasm
 Persecution of Hindus
 Persecution of Buddhists
 Conversion of non-Islamic places of worship into mosques

Notes and references

Notes

Footnotes

Bibliography

 
 
 
 
 
 
 
 
 
 
 
 
 
 
 
 
 
 
 
 
 
 
 
 
 
 
 
 
 
 
 
 
 
 
 
 
 
 
 
 
 
 
 
 
 
 
 
 
 
 
 
 
 
 
 
 
 
 
 
 
 
 
 
 
 
 
 
 
 
 
 
 
 
 
 
 
 
 
 
 
 
 
 
 
 
 
 
 
 
 
 
  – India , Pakistan

External links
History of Islam in India by Neria Harish Hebbar (article with several pages)
Library of modern Hindu history – The Islamic Ages
A Response to Muslim Legacy in India
Historical Interaction of Buddhism and Islam (Including an e-book on the various phases of Muslim Rulers conquering India)
Story of Pakistan
History of Crafts, Manufacturing and Trade in South Asia
Resources for the study of the Muslim Period of India

Spread of Islam
Islamic rule in the Indian subcontinent
Medieval India
History of Pakistan
History of Hinduism
South Asia
12th-century Islam
13th-century Islam
14th-century Islam
15th-century Islam
16th-century Islam
Hinduism in South Asia
Islam in South Asia